Paynesville may refer to:

Australia
Paynesville, Victoria
Paynesville, Western Australia

Liberia
Paynesville, Liberia

United States
Paynesville, California
Paynesville, Indiana
Paynesville, Minnesota
Paynesville, Missouri
Paynesville Township, Stearns County, Minnesota

See also
Painesville, Ohio
Lake City, Nevada County, California, also called Painesville